The Denny Sanford Premier Center is an indoor arena in Sioux Falls, South Dakota. The building is located at 1201 North West Avenue, and is connected to the Sioux Falls Arena and Sioux Falls Convention Center. The Arena's naming rights partners, and largest sponsors, are Sanford Health, First Premier Bank and Premier Bankcard.

Completed in 2014, the arena has a seating capacity of approximately 12,000 spectators and replaces the DakotaDome and Rushmore Plaza Civic Center as the largest indoor venue in South Dakota. The Sioux Falls Arena hosts smaller concerts and events, while the Denny Sanford Premier Center hosts large scale concerts and sporting events.

History

A replacement of the Sioux Falls Arena had been discussed since 1999, with numerous task forces formed and studies completed to determine the need for a new events center.  The Sioux Falls Arena was built in 1961 when the population of Sioux Falls was 65,000.  By 2000, the population had nearly doubled to 124,000 while updates to the Arena were few and far between. After years of arguments and meetings, the new events center was put to a public vote in a special election on November 8, 2011. By a vote of 23,284 to 16,807, Sioux Falls citizens passed the events center special ballot, allowing design and construction of a new events center to begin. Breaking ground in 2014, it was built on the west side of the Sioux Falls Convention Center.

Events

The first concert, Joan Jett and the Blackhearts and Starship featuring Mickey Thomas was held on September 24, 2014. On October 3, 2014, Jason Aldean and Florida Georgia Line performed with Tyler Farr.

Slipknot, along with guests Korn and opening band King 810, performed as part of the "Prepare for Hell" tour on November 9, 2014. Eric Church and Dwight Yoakam performed at the venue on December 6, 2014 as part of The Outsiders World Tour.

The Premier Center hosts the Summit League men's and women's basketball tournaments every year in March. The winners receive automatic berths in the NCAA Division I men's and women's tournaments.

The arena also hosts the Sioux Falls Stampede of the United States Hockey League and the Sioux Falls Storm of the Indoor Football League.

From 2015 to 2017, the Professional Bull Riders (PBR) association hosted an annual Built Ford Tough Series event. Since 2017 the PBR has hosted an Unleash the Beast Series event at the Premier Center, known as the First Premier Bank/Premier Bankcard Invitational.
Garth Brooks  and Trisha Yearwood brought their three and half year world tour to the arena for nine sold out concerts in September 2017.

Shania Twain brought her Rock This Country Tour to the arena on September 23, 2015. She returned for her Shania Now Tour on May 16, 2018. James Taylor performed there with his band.

Paul McCartney kicked off the Midwest leg of his  One on One Tour at the arena on May 2, 2016. This marked his first performance in South Dakota as well as McCartney's first-ever performance as a solo artist of "A Hard Day's Night" and the first time the song was performed by a Beatle in half a century since the Beatles played it for the last time on 31 August 1965 at the Cow Palace in Daly City, California.

References

External links
Official website
City of Sioux Falls website
Sioux Falls Sports Authority website

Basketball venues in South Dakota
Indoor arenas in South Dakota
Indoor ice hockey venues in the United States
Sioux Falls Storm
Sports venues in Sioux Falls, South Dakota
Sports venues completed in 2014
2014 establishments in South Dakota